Phyllocnistis signata is a moth of the family Gracillariidae, known from Tamil Nadu, India. It was described by E. Meyrick in 1915.

References

Phyllocnistis
Endemic fauna of India
Moths of Asia